Gao Zhilin (Chinese: 高志林; Pinyin: Gāo Zhìlín; born 8 January 1991) is a Chinese footballer who currently plays for Fujian Tianxin in the China League Two.

Club career
Gao Zhilin started his football career in 2008 when he was loaned to Hong Kong First Division League side Sheffield United (Hong Kong) from Chengdu Blades. He transferred to Guangzhou Evergrande in 2010 and was promoted to the first team in 2011. Gao made his debut for Guangzhou on 4 May 2011 in a 3–2 home win against Guizhou Zhicheng in the 2011 Chinese FA Cup and made his league debut on 12 June 2011 in a 1–0 away win against Tianjin Teda. Gao scored his first goal on his second league appearance for Guangzhou on 6 August 2011 in a 4–0 home win against Qingdao Jonoon and scored the last goal of the match. Gao scored three goals in thirteen appearances in the 2011 season as Guangzhou won the top tier league title for the first time in the club's history.

Career statistics 	
Statistics accurate as of match played 13 October 2019.

Honours

Club
Guangzhou Evergrande
Chinese Super League: 2011, 2012
Chinese FA Super Cup: 2012

Meizhou Kejia 
China League Two: 2015

References

External links

1991 births
Living people
People from Wuhua
Chinese footballers
Footballers from Meizhou
Guangzhou F.C. players
Meizhou Hakka F.C. players
Hong Kong First Division League players
Chinese Super League players
China League One players
Association football midfielders
Hakka sportspeople